The Greater Taichung International Expo Center (GTIEC) is a convention center in Wuri District, Taichung, Taiwan.

History
The convention center was opened on 7 October 2011.

Architecture
The convention center is divided into 4 exhibition halls, which are hall A, hall B, hall C and hall D.

Events
The convention center hosts various exhibition events, such as hardware etc.

Transportation
The convention center is accessible within walking distance north of Taichung Station of Taiwan HSR.

See also
 List of tourist attractions in Taiwan

References

External links

 

2011 establishments in Taiwan
Convention centers in Taichung
Event venues established in 2011